James Beaven (9 July 1801 – 8 November 1875) was a Church of England clergyman and author, educated and employed in England until accepting an appointment as professor of divinity at King's College, Toronto, in 1843.

Beaven was an accomplished classical scholar and wrote a number of books. Three of these were scholarly sermons. His subjects also included the writings of Cicero and the life and writings of St Irenaeus. A well known book documented a diocesan tour in 1845 by Bishop John Strachan. His Elements of Natural Theology is sometimes regarded as the first philosophical work written in English in Canada.

Beaven and his wife had seven children; one son, Robert, became premier of British Columbia from 1882 to 1883.

External links 
 Biography at the Dictionary of Canadian Biography Online
 Biography at the Canadian Encyclopedia
 Papers of James Beaven's daughter, Catherine Beaven, are held by the University of Toronto Archives and Record Management Services.

1801 births
1875 deaths
19th-century English Anglican priests
19th-century Canadian Anglican priests
Canadian Anglican theologians